The South African Premier Division, officially referred to as the DStv Premiership for sponsorship purposes, is the premier men's professional football/soccer league and the highest division in the league system of South Africa, organized since 1996.

As the top-level division in South Africa, it is commonly referred to as the Premier Soccer League (PSL) – the administrator of association football in the country.

History

The league was founded in 1996 after an agreement between the National Soccer League and the remnants of the National Professional Soccer League. It is stated on its website that the former name still exists today, but for legal purposes, with the Premier Soccer League being its trade name.

The league was reduced from 18 to 16 teams after the end of the 2001–02 season to avoid fixture congestion, causing the disbandment of two teams; Ria Stars and Free State Stars, though the latter was reformed and competing as of the 2020–21 season. In 2004, a match-fixing scandal rocked the football/soccer landscape in South Africa. An investigation codenamed "Operation Dribble" was launched by the police system of South Africa police in June 2004. More than 40 arrests were made, ranging from club bosses to match commissioners, referees and their assistants. Kaizer Chiefs successfully defended their league title in 2005 after they won the prestigious trophy in 2004 for the first time in a decade. The 2005–06 season saw Mamelodi Sundowns capturing the title for a fourth time. Since the 2017–18 season, they have dominated the league with winning league title after league title.

In 2007, the PSL signed a television deal with SuperSport worth R 1.6 billion, which was the biggest sporting deal in the history of the country and ranked the league into the top 15 in the world in terms of commercial broadcast deals. In the same year, ABSA replaced Castle Lager as the title sponsor, with the latter having sponsored the league since its inception. SuperSport United won 3 league titles in a row between 2008 and 2010.

As of May 2019, the league is rated as the 6th best in Africa according to the CAF 5-Year Ranking system.

For the 2018–19 season, the PSL gives each club a monthly grant of R 2 million, with funds coming from the television broadcasting rights and national sponsorships, with the league champion earning R 10 million.

In 2019, ABSA increased their sponsorship deal to the PSL to R 39.9 million, which meant that the league winners would secure R 15 million. ABSA would however announce its cancellation of its sponsorship with the PSL a year later on 4 June 2020.

On 24 September 2020, Dr. Irvin Khoza and MultiChoice announced on live television that the new sponsor would be DStv, effectively rebranding the league as the DStv Premiership. MultiChoice also announced that Showmax would replace DStv as the jersey sponsor of SuperSport United F.C. so the latter would be independent to sponsor the league outright.

CEOs
 Trevor Phillips: 1996–1998
 Joe Ndlela: 1998–2000 
 Robin Petersen: 2000–2001 (resigned)
 Trevor Phillips: 2002–2007
 Kjetil Siem: 2007–2011
 Zola Majavu: 2011 (resigned)
 Stanley Matthews: 2012 (resigned)
 Cambridge Mokanyane: 2013 (acting)
 Brand de Villers: 2013–2015
 Mato Madlala: 2016 – present (acting)

Qualification for CAF competitions

Association ranking for 2021–22 CAF competitions
Association ranking for the 2021–22 CAF Champions League and the 2021–22 CAF Confederation Cup will be based on results from each CAF tournament from 2017 to 2020–21.

Legend
 CL: CAF Champions League
 CC: CAF Confederation Cup

Sponsorship
The league has had title sponsorships since its inception. Like the EFL Cup and the English Football League divisions in England, the league takes its title sponsor's name to determine its official common name:

 1996–2007: Castle Lager (Castle Premiership)
 2007–2020: ABSA (ABSA Premiership)
 2020–present: DStv (DStv Premiership)

Format
As of the 2021–22 season, the league is composed of 16 teams competing from August to May each season, similar to the format of most European football leagues. Each team plays the other teams twice in a double round-robin format using the three points for a win system.

At the conclusion of each season, the champion and runner-up of the Premier Division qualify for the CAF Champions League, while the 3rd-place team and the Nedbank Cup champions qualify for the CAF Confederation Cup. The bottom team in the league is automatically relegated and replaced by the winner of the GladAfrica Championship, whiles the team finishing immediately above the bottom team enters a mini-league playoff series with the 2nd and 3rd-placed league-finished teams of the GladAfrica Championship, with the playoff winners earning their place in the Premiership for the following season.

Broadcasting
The league's broadcaster is SuperSport, who in turn sub-leases the broadcasting rights to the SABC, so as to broadcast some matches on public television in South Africa. SuperSport was awarded an initial $277 million 5-year broadcast/TV rights deal in 2007 by the Premier Soccer League to help commercialize the league globally beyond South Africa. matches on sunset times between Tuesdays and Fridays and on weekends whereas the SABC telecast matches played on Wednesday nights and on weekends.

Since 2016, as SuperSport is a brand owned by the MultiChoice Group, the league is available to watch live and on demand via their specified services; the DStv App (formerly DStv Mobile and DStv Now) and Showmax Pro. Both are accessible via the DStv website for PC and Mac and as mobile apps on Android and iOS/iPadOS for mobile phones, tablets and Smart TVs.

Past seasons

Previous Winners, Runner-up, Relegated & Promoted Teams

League titles by club

Manager records

League winning managers

Most successful managers 

  Gordon Igesund is the only manager to have won the league with 4 clubs; Manning Rangers 1996-97, Orlando Pirates 2000-01, Santos 2001-02, Mamelodi Sundowns 2006-07.
  Gavin Hunt and  Pitso Mosimane are the managers that have retained the title the most times; (3) SuperSport United 2007–08, 2008–09, 2009–10, (3) Mamelodi Sundowns 2017-18, 2018–19, 2019-20 respectively.
 Seven foreign managers have won the league, with  Ted Dumitru having won the most titles, 4.

League records
Ever presents (714 matches): Kaizer Chiefs, Mamelodi Sundowns, Orlando Pirates, SuperSport United
Most Premier Division titles: 12 – Mamelodi Sundowns (1997/98), (1998/99), (1999/00), (2005/06), (2006/07), (2013/14), (2015/16), (2017/18), (2018/19), (2019/20), (2020/21), (2021/22)
Biggest Premier Division win: 8–1 – SuperSport United vs Zulu Royals (2003/04)
Most wins: 373– Mamelodi Sundowns
Most draws: 154 – Orlando Pirates
Most defeats: 184 – Ajax Cape Town
Most goals scored in a season: 73 – Kaizer Chiefs (1998/99)
Most goals conceded in a season: 85 – Mother City (1999/00)
Most points in a season: 75 – Mamelodi Sundowns (1998/99) & (1999/00) and Kaizer Chiefs (1998/99)
Most points in a season (30 games): 71 – Mamelodi Sundowns (2015/16)

League participants

Local trophies winners

Top goalscorers

All-time top goalscorers
123 goals: Siyabonga Nomvete
111 goals: Daniel Mudau
104 goals: Manuel Bucuane
104 goals: Mabhuti Khenyeza
101 goals: Siphiwe Tshabalala
101 goals: Collins Mbesuma

NB: list includes all players who have scored at least 100 goals in the PSL era. Also includes cup competitions.

Source:

All-time table

Founding members

AmaZulu 
Bloemfontein Celtic
Cape Town Spurs
Hellenic
Jomo Cosmos
Kaizer Chiefs
Manning Rangers
Michau Warriors
Moroka Swallows

Orlando Pirates
QwaQwa Stars
Real Rovers
Mamelodi Sundowns
SuperSport United
Bush Bucks
Vaal Professionals
Witbank Aces
Wits University

See also
Association football records in South Africa
List of South African association football families
List of association footballers who died while playing
List of foreign football players in South Africa
List of one-club men in association football
Vodacom League

External links

Previous official website as ABSA Premiership (Archived)
The League History and Records at RSSSF

References

Premier Soccer League
South Africa
1
Football
Professional sports leagues in South Africa